Deltosoma is a genus of beetles in the family Cerambycidae, containing the following species:

 Deltosoma flavidum Aurivillius, 1925
 Deltosoma guatemalense Bates, 1880
 Deltosoma lacordairei Thomson, 1864
 Deltosoma xerophila Di Iorio, 1995

References

Pteroplatini